1980 saw the inaugural national football championship in Vietnam known locally as the Vietnam National A1 Football Cup.

Seventeen teams took part in the competition that was played in two stages; a Group stage featuring 3 groups of 6 and 5 teams and a Championship stage featuring the three group winners.

Originally there are 18 teams, with 8 from Hồng Hà League in the North, 2 from Trường Sơn League in the Central and 8 from Cửu Long League in the South. However, defending all-Vietnam champions Thể Công (Câu lạc bộ Quân đội) withdrawn due to internal reasons.

Group stage
Group stage winners advanced to the Championship stage.
Bottom placed teams in each group automatically relegated

Group A

Group B

Group C

Championship stage

References

Vietnamese Super League seasons
1
Viet
Viet